Antonio Francesco Manciolino (... - ...; fl. 1518-1531) is considered one of the most important masters of the so-called "Bolognese School" of fencing.

There is very little biographical information about Antonio Francesco Manciolino: on November 24, 1518 he signed a contract for the publication of one thousand copies of his treatise on fencing with the Roman printer Stefano Guillery, committing to pay for the books two months after delivery; no other trace of this edition remains.

Opera Nova 
In 1531 in Venice, a treatise was printed under his name entitled Opera Nova per Imparare a Combattere, & Schermire d'ogni forte Armi, considered one of the major fencing works of the sixteenth century, consisting of six books and a prologue. It is possible that the work had been prepared almost a decade earlier, and that it was not Manciolino who printed it.

In the Opera Nuova there are several types of combat for the duel between two contenders. The largest part is dedicated to the combat of sword and buckler as in the treatise of the contemporary Achille Marozzo, since this discipline remains the cornerstone of the teaching of ancient fencing, at least until the mid-sixteenth century, especially of Bolognese fencing. In the remaining part of the treatise there are teachings of sword, sword and dagger, sword and cape, sword and cape two against two, sword and rotella, sword and broad buckler or targe, billhook, partisan, picca, and others.

Note

Bibliography

See also 

 Historical European Martial Arts
 Achille Marozzo

External links 

 Il trattato di Antonio Manciolino from achillemarozzo.it. URL consulted on 20 January 2010 (archived from original URL on 2 November 2010).
 La pagina di Antonio Manciolino su Scrimipedia from scrimipedia.it (archived from original URL on 14 may 2016).

Historical fencing

16th-century Italian people
16th-century Italian writers